ISO, formerly known as Isochronous, is a rock band from Pretoria, South Africa. The group was formed in November 2006 by members Richard Brokensha, Marko Benini, Franco Schoeman and Alex Parker.

The evolution of ISO has been staggering both locally and internationally. This prog rock band has gained respect and recognition with their unique music and inspiring live performances in an industry that has quickly elevated them to a well respected group with an enviable reputation in the circuit. With an impressive live show that incorporates the latest in sound and lighting technologies, ISO has been recognised as a world class act by critics and the press in general.

History 
ISO formed in late 2006 under the name Isochronous and soon became one of the top bands to watch in South Africa. They released their self-titled debut album in 2008 which was distributed through Sony BMG South Africa. Their second acoustic album Imago, was released and distributed independently in 2010.

After touring Germany in 2010 as the opening act for local music icon Marius Müller-Westernhagen, this Pretoria based band confirmed their status as one of the best live acts in South Africa. While participating in a 10 show stadium tour which reported over 100,000 spectators, the group performed at some of the most prestigious venues in Germany whilst receiving great coverage and reviews from the German media and entertainment press. In 2012, they released their Live in Germany DVD of their performance at the 02 World Arena in Berlin.

In 2011, their third album, entitled Inscape, followed. The album was recorded at Sound & Motion Studios in Cape Town and has been described as a refreshing translation of what the group succeeds to create on stage. Destiny and Torpid brought commercial success with the singles being play listed on national radio stations across SA. Torpid also peaked at nr. 8 on the 5FM Top 40 Chart. ISO was also chosen as one of the winners of the MK MVP in 2011 for a music video for Destiny. The video reached nr. 1 on the MK Top 10 Music Videos Chart for two weeks in a row.
In March 2012, ISO was chosen as one of the opening acts for international band, Two Door Cinema Club, on their first tour to South Africa. With the release of their DVD in June 2012, ISO also did a nationwide tour to promote its release.

September 2012 saw the release of Piece by Piece. No Fire, the first single from the album, went on to receive extensive airplay on national and regional radio stations across South Africa and reached nr. 2 on the 5FM Top 40 Chart. Everytime followed as second single, and reached nr. 7 on the 5FM Top 40 and also nr. 1 on UCT Radio, KovsieFM and PukFM. The band released Heaven as third single in April 2013, and it also reached nr. 1 on UCT Radio and KovsieFM within the first few weeks since its release.

The band also received a MK Award Nomination for Best Group for their music video Destiny in February 2013 and performed at the prestigious award ceremony on 24 March 2013.

In July 2013, the band recorded a single with JR entitled ‘Death By Designer’ for the 5FM MashLab feature, which was subsequently play listed on 5FM. July also saw the release of their music video for Heaven, as well as an iBook entitled ‘ISO Discography’ – a first for a South African band.

ISO released a brand new single, "Never Going Back", in February 2014, the first single from their EP Passages released in March 2014. ISO recorded the EP with producer Peach van Pletzen at Sleeproom Studios in Pretoria over a period of four weeks in 2013.

Early 2015, the band announced the departure of drummer Marko Benini from the band, and soon after Nick Mc Creadie joined the band as new drummer. ISO then went into studio to record their 6th album Polydimension before taking a break from the touring circuit.

Band members
 Richard Brokensha - Lead vocals and guitars
Marko Benin - Drums and vocals (until 2015) 
 Nicholas McCreadie - Drums and vocals 
 Franco Schoeman - Bass guitar and vocals
 Alex Parker - Keyboards and vocals

Discography

Albums
 Isochronous (LP,2008)
 Imago (LP, 2010)
 Inscape (LP, 2011)
 Piece by Piece (LP, 2012)
 Passages (EP, 2014)
 Polydimension (LP, 2016)

Singles

Videography

Music videos

References

External links

Isochronous Official Website
Purchase Isochronous CD online

Musical groups established in 2006
Musical quartets
People from Pretoria
South African art rock groups
South African rock music groups